Chocolate-covered coffee beans are confections made by coating roasted coffee beans in some kind of chocolate, typically milk chocolate but often also dark chocolate or white chocolate. They are usually only slightly sweet, especially the dark chocolate kind, and the coffee bean has a bitter flavor. 

Like all chocolate products, they are rich in fat, and since their main ingredient is coffee beans, they are very high in caffeine; some brands contain over 300 mg of caffeine per 40 g serving.

See also
 List of chocolate-covered foods
 List of coffee dishes
 List of desserts

References

Chocolate-covered foods
Coffee dishes